U-128 may refer to one of the following German submarines:

 , a Type U 127 submarine laid down during the First World War but unfinished at the end of the war; broken up incomplete 1919–20
 During the First World War, Germany also had this submarine with a similar name:
 , a Type UB III submarine launched in 1918 and surrendered on 3 February 1919; dumped on beach at Falmouth after explosive trials 1921 and broken up in situ
 , a Type IXC submarine that served in the Second World War until sunk on 17 May 1943

Submarines of Germany